Dwight d'Eon (born December 18, 1978) is a Canadian singer/song writer from West Pubnico, Nova Scotia. He was a competitor on season 5 of Canadian Idol, and was eliminated on August 29, 2007, placing him 4th.

Canadian Idol 
Dwight auditioned for Canadian Idol in Halifax, Nova Scotia.

Songs Dwight performed on Canadian Idol
Top 22: Cry (Philosopher Kings)
Top 18 – Used To Be Alright (I Mother Earth)
Top 14 – Bright Lights (Matchbox 20)
Top 10 – Unwell (Matchbox 20)
Top 9 – Undone (The Guess Who)
Top 8 – Every Breath You Take (Sting)
Top 7 – Tie Your Mother Down (Queen)
Top 6 – Smooth (Santana with Rob Thomas)
Top 5 – Bed of Roses (Bon Jovi)
Top 4 – I Get a Kick Out of You (Frank Sinatra), Unforgettable (Nat King Cole)

Personal life
d'Eon resides in the city of Halifax, Nova Scotia, and is the current owner of the Anytime Fitness location there.
D'Eon is part of the Halifax-based band Lacewood.

References

External links 
 
 Dwight d'Eon's Official Music Myspace
 Dwight's Record Label

1978 births
Living people
Canadian Idol participants
People from Yarmouth County